Karl Theodor Robert Luther (16 April 1822, Świdnica – 15 February 1900 Düsseldorf), normally published as Robert Luther, was a German astronomer. While working at the Bilk Observatory in Düsseldorf, Germany, he searched for asteroids and discovered 24 of them between 1852 and 1890. Seven times Lalande Prize winner.

Biography
Karl Theodor Robert Luther was born on 16 April 1822 to August Luther and Wilhelmine von Ende. He was home schooled and studied in the local high school. In 1841, he moved to Breslau where he studied until 1843.

In 1843 Luther moved to Berlin to study astronomy. He was a student of Johann Franz Encke and helped him in his astronomical calculations and creating the astronomical almanac. In 1850 he became a second observer.
In 1851, Franz Brünnow invited Luther to the Düsseldorf-Bilk Observatory to become a director of the observatory after him.

Luther married  Caroline (nee Marker) and they had one son, William. Luther died in 1900 after a short illness in Düsseldorf.

Discoveries
Luther discovered 24 of them between 1852 and 1890.

Two of his discoveries are now known to have unusual properties: 90 Antiope, a binary asteroid with equal components, and the extremely slow-rotating 288 Glauke.

Honors and awards
The asteroid 1303 Luthera and the lunar crater Luther were named in his honour.

He was awarded the Lalande Prize seven times, in 1852, 1853, 1854, 1855, 1859, 1860 and 1861.

Royal Astronomical Society Fellow since June 1854.

In 1869, a commemorative medal honoring the discovery of the 100th asteroid shows the profiles of John Russel Hind, Hermann Goldschmidt and Robert Luther.

References 
 

1822 births
1900 deaths
Discoverers of asteroids

19th-century German astronomers
Recipients of the Lalande Prize